The Lamb is a 2014 Turkish-German drama film directed by Kutluğ Ataman. The film had its premiere in the Panorama section of the 64th Berlin International Film Festival.

Cast
 Nesrin Cavadzade as Medine
 Güven Kıraç as Muhtar
 Şerif Sezer as Leyla
 Taner Birsel as Adnan Bey
 Nursel Köse as Safiye

References

External links
 
 

2014 films
2014 drama films
German drama films
Turkish drama films
2010s Turkish-language films
2010s German films